Centipede is a 2018 Iranian comedy film directed by Abolhassan Davoudi and written by Amir Baradaran, Peyman Jazini, and Mostafa Zandi. It is the sixth highest-grossing film of all time in Iran. The film was theatrically released in Iran on 4 July 2018.

Plot 
Reza and his friend Mansoor are pickpockets. When Reza finds out from his mother that a rich girl took an oath to marry a person injured in a war, he decides to get close to her and find a way to marry her and inherit her fortune.

Cast 

 Reza Attaran as Reza Niazi
 Javad Ezzati as Mansoor
 Sara Bahrami as Elham Abbasi
 Mehran Ahmadi as Uncle Kamran
 Saeed Amirsoleimani as Hassan
 Shohreh Lorestani as Shirin
 Omid Rouhani as Elham's Father

Reception

Box office 
The film broke several box office records and In the fifth week of its theatrical run, it became the highest-grossing film in Iran (until it was surpassed by Motreb). The film became a major box office success in Iran, grossing 30 billion toman in less than 2 months, and surpassing 4 million ticket sales in its first 45 days. It became the first Iranian movie to gross over 30 billion toman in Iran, in the seventh week of its release.

Home media 
The film was released on a home media as a two-part film, each part lasting 90 minutes (the first part on 5 March and the second part on 13 March 2019). This caused protests and dissatisfaction from people. Critics said this was unusual and not enough information had been provided to buyers. Finally, the film distribution company stated that the reason for this was to increase the film duration from 122 minutes to 197 minutes and to add behind-the-scenes footage.

References

External links 

Iranian romantic comedy films
2010s Persian-language films
Films about marriage
All articles with unsourced statements
2018 romantic comedy films
2018 films